Agua Caliente County Park is a  park with geothermally heated springs. The park is located just west of Anza-Borrego Desert State Park, in eastern San Diego County, California. Spring water feed pools include an outdoor swimming pool, an outdoor wading pool for children, and an indoor  therapeutic spa. Site amenities include a caravan area, full and partial hookup RV sites, non-hookup sites, tent camping, and cabins. Facilities include shuffle board, horseshoes, day use picnic area, and dressing rooms.  hiking trails from flat terrain to steep rocky trails.

Season and hours
The park is open from the Friday of Labor Day weekend until Memorial Day. The park is closed during the hot summer months. Camping is open 24 hours and campsites can be reserved as far as a year in advance. Day use from 9:30 am to 5:00 pm. Pool hours are from 9:30 am – 5:00 pm with later hours on weekends for campers and early mornings (9:30am–10:30am) reserved for adults.

Destinations nearby

North
 Banner, California about  40 minutes
 Julian, California about  1 hour 
 Anza-Borrego State Park about  1 hour

South
 El Centro, California about  1 hour

See also
Agua Caliente Airport

References

Parks in San Diego County, California
Campgrounds in California
Tourist attractions in San Diego County, California